The von Baeyer nomenclature is a system for describing polycyclic hydrocarbons. The system was originally developed in 1900 by Adolf von Baeyer for bicyclic systems and in 1913 expanded by Eduard Buchner and Wilhelm Weigand for tricyclic systems. The system has been adopted and extended by the IUPAC as part of its nomenclature for organic chemistry. The modern version has been extended to cover more cases of compounds including an arbitrary number of cycles, heterocyclic compounds and unsaturated compounds.

Extended Von Baeyer

See also 
 Clar's Rule: Polycyclic aromatic hydrocarbon#Physicochemical properties and bonding

References 

Chemical nomenclature